Jean-Claude Goyon (2 August 1937 – 24 June 2021) was a French Egyptologist.

Biography
After earning a doctoral degree in literature, Goyon became a research fellow at the French National Centre for Scientific Research and a professor of Egyptology at Lumière University Lyon 2. 

Goyon died in Villeurbanne on 24 June 2021 at the age of 83.

Publications
Le papyrus du Louvre n°3279 (1966)
Confirmation du pouvoir royal au nouvel an (1972)
Rituels funéraires de l'ancienne Égypte, le rituel de l'embaumement, le rituel de l'ouverture de la bouche, les livres des respirations (1972)
Ramesseum I et VI (1973)
Confirmation du pouvoir royal au nouvel an (1974)
Le secret des pyramides (1977)
Les dieux-gardiens et la genèse des temples d'après les textes égyptiens de l'époque gréco-romaine, les soixante d'Edfou et les soixante dix sept dieux de Pharbaethos (1985)
Les bâtisseurs de Karnak (1987)
Un corps pour l'éternité. Autopsie d'une momie (1988)
L'Égypte restituée, sites et temples de Haute-Égypte (1650 av. J.-C.-300 Ap. J.-C.) (1991)
Amphores grecques archaïques de Gurna : à propos d'une publication récente (1992)
Chirurgie religieuse ou thanatopraxie ? Données nouvelles sur la momification en Égypte et réflexions qu'elles impliquent (1992)
L'Égypte restituée, Sites et temples des déserts, de la naissance de la civilisation pharaonique à l'époque gréco-romaine (1994)
Remarques sur l'ouvrage de F. de Romanis (1996)
L'Égypte restituée, sites, temples et pyramides de Moyenne et Basse Égypte de la naissance de la civilisation pharaonique à l'époque gréco-romaine (1997)
Rê, Maât et pharaon ou Le destin de l'Égypte antique (1998)
L'Égypte antique : À travers la collection de l'institut d'égyptologie Victor-Loret de Lyon (2007)

Distinctions
Prix Bordin (1973)
Knight of the Legion of Honour

References

1937 births
2021 deaths
French Egyptologists
French National Centre for Scientific Research scientists
University of Lyon alumni
Members of the Institut Français d'Archéologie Orientale
People from Mâcon
Chevaliers of the Légion d'honneur
Recipients of the Legion of Honour